United Nations Security Council Resolution 240, adopted on October 25, 1967, condemned the violations of the cease-fire worked out in past resolutions (primarily United Nations Security Council Resolution 234) and expressed its regrets at the casualties and loss of property that resulted from the violations.  The Council reaffirmed the necessity of the strict observance of the cease-fire resolutions and demanded that the member states concerned cease immediately all prohibited military activities in the area and co-operate fully and promptly with the United Nations Truce Supervision Organization.

The meeting, requested by Israel, Syria and the United Arab Republic to contest various allegations, adopted the resolution unanimously.

See also
List of United Nations Security Council Resolutions 201 to 300 (1965–1971)
Six-Day War

References

External links
 
Text of the Resolution at undocs.org

 0240
Six-Day War
Israeli–Palestinian conflict and the United Nations
 0240
October 1967 events